Leigh Verstraete (born January 6, 1962) is a former professional ice hockey player who played eight games in the National Hockey League.  He played with the Toronto Maple Leafs.

Career statistics

References

External links

1962 births
Billings Bighorns players
Calgary Wranglers (WHL) players
Canadian ice hockey right wingers
Living people
Muskegon Mohawks players
Newmarket Saints players
St. Catharines Saints players
Toronto Maple Leafs draft picks
Toronto Maple Leafs players
Ice hockey people from Calgary